The America East Conference's Men's Lacrosse Tournament began in 2000, with the winner of the tournament receiving the conference's automatic bid into the NCAA Men's Lacrosse Championship.

Tournament
The America East Conference Tournament is a four team single-elimination tournament held annually at various location's in the America East Conference region.  The four teams with the best conference record in the America East Conference at the end of the regular season earn berths in the tournament.  The winner receives an automatic bid to the NCAA Men's Lacrosse Championship. The other teams on the other hand have to hope for an at-large bid into the NCAA Men's Lacrosse Championship.

History
The America East Conference tournament began in 2000. From 1992 through 1999 no tournament for the conference was held. Instead the regular season champion received the automatic bid to the NCAA Men's Lacrosse Championship.

Tournament Champions

Source

Performance By School

* former member of the conference
Sources:

References

External links
 Official website

College lacrosse conference competitions in the United States